Maria Josepha Weber (later Josepha Hofer, Josepha Meier; 1758 – 29 December 1819) was a German soprano of the classical era.  She was a sister-in-law of Wolfgang Amadeus Mozart, and the first to perform the role of The Queen of the Night in Mozart's opera The Magic Flute (1791).

Life
She was born in Zell im Wiesental, in present-day Baden-Württemberg, Germany, the daughter of Fridolin Weber and Cäcilia Weber (née Stamm). She had three younger sisters (in descending order of age): Aloysia, who was an early love interest of Mozart and sang in his later operas; Constanze, who married Mozart in 1782; and Sophie. The composer Carl Maria von Weber was the son of her father's half-brother.

Josepha grew up mostly in Mannheim, and moved with her family first to Munich then to Vienna, following the singing career of her sister Aloysia.  By 1789 she was the prima donna in the theatrical troupe run by Johann Friedel at the suburban Theater auf der Wieden.  Following Friedel's death in that year, the theater was taken over by Emanuel Schikaneder, who retained her in the new company he formed. She appears to have been an important member of the troupe: the collaborative opera Der Stein der Weisen, a sort of ancestor to The Magic Flute, includes no arias for coloratura soprano because at the time it was written Hofer was on maternity leave.

At the (highly successful) premiere of The Magic Flute in 1791, Hofer took the role of the Queen of the Night, a famously demanding coloratura part.  She continued to perform this role until 1801, when she relinquished it at age 43.

Hofer also premiered other roles.  She was again the Queen of the Night in Schikaneder and Winter's sequel to The Magic Flute, Das Labyrinth oder der Kampf mit den Elementen (1798). She was also the first to perform the role of Oberon in Paul Wranitzky’s opera (1789).

She married twice.  Her first husband (married 21 July 1788 in St. Stephen's Cathedral) was the musician Franz de Paula Hofer (1755–96). Hofer was employed as a violinist at the Imperial court.  Her second husband (1797) was the singer Sebastian Meier (1773–1835). Meier was the first to perform the role of Pizarro in Beethoven's opera Fidelio.

Josepha Meier retired from singing in 1805, and died in Vienna on 29 December 1819.

Assessment
Of her singing, the New Grove says; "According to contemporary reports, she commanded a very high tessitura but had a rough edge to her voice and lacked stage presence."  The former quality equipped her to take on the very difficult coloratura passages that Mozart wrote into the Queen of the Night's part.

References

References 
 Except as indicated by footnote all information above is taken from the article "Weber", in the online edition of Grove's Dictionary of Music and Musicians. Copyright 2007, Oxford University Press
 Buch, David (ed.; 2007) Der Stein der Weisen. (Full score) A-R Editions, Inc. 
 Deutsch, Otto Erich (1965) Mozart:  A Documentary Biography. Stanford, CA: Stanford University Press
 Der Zauberfloete zweyter Theil unter dem Titel: Das Labyrinth oder der Kampf mit den Elementen. (Libretto) edited by Manuela Jahrmärker und Till Gerrit Waidelich, Tutzing 1992, 
 Oberon, König der Elfen. Singspiel in drei Akten von Paul Wranitzky. Libretto von Karl Ludwig Giesecke. Edited by Christoph-Hellmut Mahling and Joachim Veit [Partitur, Ausg. in 2 volumes](Die Oper; volume 4). Munich: G. Henle 1993

1758 births
1819 deaths
18th-century German women opera singers
19th-century German women opera singers
German expatriates in Austria
German operatic sopranos
Mozart family
People from Lörrach (district)
The Magic Flute
Musicians from Baden-Württemberg